Labiduridae, whose members are known commonly as striped earwigs, is a relatively large family of earwigs in the suborder Forficulina.

Taxonomy
The family contains a total of approximately 72 species, spread across seven genera in three subfamilies. Some well-known members of the family include Labidura riparia, commonly known as the tawny earwig, and Gonolabidura meteor. The family is mostly cosmopolitan, so it can be found around the world. At least two species have been described from middle Cretaceous aged Burmese amber, Myrrholabia and Zigrasolabis.

Description
The family's members are moderate to large earwigs, and are cylindrically shaped with well-developed wings. They have especially long antennae, while some segments can be shorter, and large cerci.

Genera
The family contains the following genera:

 Subfamily Allostethinae Verhoeff, 1904
 Allostethella Zacher, 1910
 Allostethus Verhoeff, 1904
 Gonolabidura Zacher, 1910
 Protolabidura Steinmann, 1985
 Subfamily Labidurinae Verhoeff, 1902
 Forcipula Bolivar, 1897
 Labidura Leach, 1815
 Tomopygia Burr, 1904
 †Myrrholabia Engel & Grimaldi, 2004 Burmese amber, Myanmar, Cenomanian
 †Zigrasolabis Engel and Grimaldi 2014 Burmese amber, Myanmar, Cenomanian
 
 Subfamily Nalinae Steinmann, 1975
 Nala Zacher, 1910
 Incertae sedis
 †Caririlabia Martins-Neto, 1990 Crato Formation, Brazil, Aptian
 †Labiduromma Scudder 1885 Florissant, Colorado, Eocene

References

External links

 The Earwig Research Centre's Labiduridae database Source for references: type Labiduridae in the "family" field and click "search".
 Australian Faunal Directory: Labiduridae
 An image of the family.

Dermaptera families
Extant Albian first appearances
Forficulina
Taxa named by Karl Wilhelm Verhoeff